Mojave King (born 11 June 2002) is a New Zealand-American professional basketball player for the NBA G League Ignite of the NBA G League. He previously played for the Southland Sharks of the New Zealand National Basketball League (NZNBL).

Early life and career
King was born in Dunedin, New Zealand and was named after the Mojave Desert in the southwestern United States.

In 2007, at the age of four, Mojave moved with his family to Mackay, Queensland when his father accepted a role to coach the Mackay Meteors in Australia's semi-professional Queensland Basketball League. The family settled in Brisbane four years later when the father accepted a position to coach the Brisbane Spartans in the South East Australian Basketball League. Mojave attended Brisbane State High School as a teenager.

In January 2019, King joined the NBA Global Academy, a training center at the Australian Institute of Sport in Canberra. In association with the academy, he played for BA Centre of Excellence in the NBL1, an Australian semi-professional league. Later that year, King represented Queensland South at the Australian Under-18 Championships, where he led the competition in scoring with 26.6 points per game. At the NBA Academy Games in Atlanta, Georgia in July 2019, he averaged a tournament-high 19.2 points per game.

Professional career
On 12 March 2020, at the age of 17, King signed with the Cairns Taipans of the National Basketball League (NBL) as a part of the league's Next Stars program to develop NBA draft prospects. By joining the NBL, he turned down offers from several NCAA Division I programs, including Arizona, Baylor, Oregon and Virginia. During the 2020–21 season, King averaged 6.2 points and 2.4 rebounds. On 14 July 2021, King was transferred to the Adelaide 36ers for the final year of his Next Stars contract.

On 19 April 2022, King signed with the Southland Sharks for the 2022 New Zealand NBL season.

On 7 September 2022, King signed a contract with the NBA G League Ignite. He was named to the G League's inaugural Next Up Game for the 2022–23 season.

National team
King is a dual citizen of New Zealand and the United States. His intention in 2019 was to obtain Australian citizenship in order to represent the Australian national team.

Personal life
King is the son of Tracey and Leonard King. His father, Leonard, is from the United States and is of Native American as well as African American descent. Leonard played and coached professionally in New Zealand. King's mother, Tracey, is a New Zealand native and played NCAA basketball for Duquesne. His older sister, Tylah, played for Pacific in the NCAA. King's maternal grandfather, John Paul, coached basketball in Otago for over 50 years and is one of the region's most prominent basketball figures.

References

External links

Eurobasket profile
RealGM profile

 

2002 births
Living people
Adelaide 36ers players
American men's basketball players
Basketball players from Brisbane
Cairns Taipans players
NBA G League Ignite players
New Zealand emigrants to Australia
New Zealand men's basketball players
Shooting guards
Southland Sharks players
Sportspeople from Dunedin